Natália Šlepecká (born  in Liptovský Mikuláš) is a Slovakian freestyle skier, specializing in slopestyle.

Šlepecká competed at the 2014 Winter Olympics for Slovakia. She placed 18th in the qualifying round in the slopestyle, failing to advance.

As of September 2015, her best showing at the World Championships is 8th, in the 2013 slopestyle.

Šlepecká made her World Cup debut in
February 2012. As of September 2015, she has one World Cup podium finish, a bronze medal at Jyväskylä in 2011–12. Her best World Cup overall finish in slopestyle is 6th, in 2011–12.

World Cup Podiums

References

1983 births
Living people
Olympic freestyle skiers of Slovakia
Freestyle skiers at the 2014 Winter Olympics
Sportspeople from Liptovský Mikuláš
Slovak female freestyle skiers